Redd Shop is an unincorporated community in Prince Edward County, Virginia, United States.

Falkland was listed on the National Register of Historic Places in 1979.

References

Unincorporated communities in Virginia
Unincorporated communities in Prince Edward County, Virginia